Bracha Peli (1892–1986) was the founder and owner of the Israeli publishing house, Massada. She was the driving force behind the publication of Encyclopaedia Hebraica, and is credited with starting Israel's annual Hebrew Book Week.

Biography
Bronya Kutzenok (later Bracha Peli) was born in Starovitzky, a small village in Russia, now Ukraine to a family of Hasidic Jews. She was the eldest of seven children. Her father, Shmuel Kutzenok, was a wealthy lumber merchant who supplied timber for artillery wagons to the Russian army. Her mother, Sarah, ran the village general store. She acquired an education by overhearing her brothers' lessons. Early on, she became proficient in Yiddish, Russian and Hebrew. In 1905, when she was about to study at a Gymnasium in Kiev, pogroms against the Jews erupted, disrupting her plans. She waited two years to complete her secondary education and study economics.

In 1914, after her mother died of tuberculosis, Peli met a young Zionist teacher, Meir Pilipovetsky, whom she married against her family's wishes. After her son, Alexander, was born she opened a Jewish secondary school that attracted 400 students in its first year.

In July 1921, Peli and her husband left Russia for Palestine, settling in Tel Aviv. In 1926, Peli opened a stall in Tel Aviv to sell books cheaply, which led to the inauguration of an annual event. Today Hebrew Book Week is a national 10-day event. The Encyclopaedia Hebraica project began using Bracha Peli's publishing house in 1946 with her son, Alexander, supervising. The last volume was published in 1996.

Bracha Peli died in 1986.

See also
Hebrew literature

References

1892 births
1986 deaths
Encyclopedists
Israeli women chief executive officers
Israeli Ashkenazi Jews
Israeli publishers (people)
20th-century Israeli businesswomen
20th-century Israeli businesspeople
Naturalized citizens of Israel
Businesspeople from Kyiv
Businesspeople from Tel Aviv
Ukrainian emigrants to Mandatory Palestine
Ukrainian Ashkenazi Jews
Zionists
Ukrainian schoolteachers
Jewish encyclopedists